Crenicichla ypo is a species of cichlid native to South America. It is found in the Arroyo Uruguaí basin, middle Paraná River basin in Misiones, Argentina.

References

Casciotta, J., A. Almirón, L. Píalek, S. Gómez and O. Rícan, 2010. Crenicichla ypo (Teleostei: Cichlidae), a new species from the middle Paraná basin in Misiones, Argentina. Neotrop. Ichthyol. 8(3):643-648.

ypo
Fish of Argentina
Taxa named by Jorge Rafael Casciotta
Taxa named by Adriana Edith Almirón
Taxa named by Lubomír Piálek
Taxa named by Sergio Enrique Gómez
Taxa named by Oldřich Říčan
Fish described in 2010